Halimedusidae is a family of cnidarians belonging to the order Anthoathecata.

Genera:
 Halimedusa Bigelow, 1916
 Tiaricodon Browne, 1902
 Urashimea Kishinouye, 1910

References

 
Capitata
Cnidarian families